Gonçalo Almeida Gregório (born 14 June 1995) is a Portuguese footballer who plays for Portuguese club União Leiria as a forward.

Club career
Born in Lisbon, Gregório spent most of his youth career in the ranks of local C.F. Os Belenenses. He never made the first team, but had loans to Vitória FC, G.S. Loures and Casa Pia AC, the latter two as a senior in the third tier.

In June 2016, Gregório rescinded his contract with the team from Belém and joined Leixões S.C. of the Segunda Liga. He made his debut on 31 July in a 2016–17 Taça da Liga match against C.D. Cova da Piedade. He made 13 total appearances for the team from Matosinhos, scoring as a substitute for Kikas in a 2–2 comeback win at home to S.C. Braga B on 19 October. On 2 January 2017, he went back to the third division on loan to S.C. Farense until the end of the season.

Gregório signed for U.D. Vilafranquense on 31 May 2017, on a one-year deal with the option of a second. The following January, he returned to Casa Pia. He scored 22 goals in 17 games in the first half of 2018–19, including three hat-tricks, of which one was a four-goal haul in a 7–0 win at Redondense FC on 9 December.

On 31 January 2019, Gregório signed a 3-year deal at F.C. Paços de Ferreira. He played eight games, just one start, as they won promotion to the Primeira Liga as champions. On 2 July, he was loaned to S.C. Braga for the upcoming season with the option to buy.

On 24 August 2020, Gregório signed a two-year contract with Polish club Zagłębie Sosnowiec.

Personal life
Gregório's father Rui played professionally as a defender, mainly for Belenenses.

References

External links

Stats and profile at LPFP 

1995 births
Living people
Footballers from Lisbon
Portuguese footballers
Association football forwards
Liga Portugal 2 players
Segunda Divisão players
I liga players
Casa Pia A.C. players
Leixões S.C. players
S.C. Farense players
F.C. Paços de Ferreira players
S.C. Braga B players
Zagłębie Sosnowiec players
Portuguese expatriate footballers
Expatriate footballers in Poland